Loughborough Junction railway station is a railway station in the Loughborough Junction neighbourhood of the London Borough of Lambeth. It was opened as Loughborough Road by the London, Chatham and Dover Railway in 1864. It is between Elephant & Castle and Herne Hill stations and is served by Thameslink.

History
In the 1860s the London, Chatham and Dover Railway (LCDR) opened its City Branch to central London with tracks between Herne Hill and Elephant and Castle opening in 1863. The line remains in use; since 1990 it has been part of the Thameslink route.

In October 1864 the LCDR opened Loughborough Road station on the north-to-west Brixton spur which connects the City Branch to the original Chatham Main Line at  station. On 1 December 1872 platforms were opened on the City branch and on the north-to-east spur (called the Cambria Road platforms and spur after nearby Cambria Road). The enlarged station was renamed Loughborough Junction. The Loughborough Road platforms closed permanently on 3 April 1916 as a wartime economy measure, by 1916 all LCDR City branch stations south of the River Thames had been closed except Loughborough Junction and Elephant & Castle.  In connection with the Southern Railway suburban electrification the platforms on Cambria Jn spur could not be lengthened so were closed on 12 July 1925.

After nationalisation the station was part of the Southern Region of British Railways and, from 1986, Network SouthEast. Around 1990 the station became part of the Thameslink route.

Services

Since September 2014, the Thameslink line has been part of Thameslink and Great Northern. Most passenger services from Loughborough Junction run between St Albans and Sutton. Some peak-hour Southeastern services between London Blackfriars and Beckenham Junction also call here.

Connections
London Buses routes 35, 45, 345, P4 and P5 and night route N35 serve the station.

Future proposals

The South London line passes across the south end of Loughborough Junction station via a bridge but has never had platforms there. As part of phase 2 of the East London line extension project, this line is now part of the London Overground network operated by Transport for London. Completed on 9 December 2012, this extension connected the South London Line to the East and West London lines, allowing rail services to run across South London from Surrey Quays to Clapham Junction. This creates an orbital network around Central London, fulfilling the Orbirail concept.

The new route passes over both Loughborough Junction and Brixton stations, and the proposals were criticised for not including new interchange stations at these locations. No London Overground platforms are planned at Loughborough Junction as the line is on high railway arches, making the cost of any station construction prohibitive. It has been proposed, as an alternative, that the disused East Brixton could be reopened instead as the site is close to both stations.

See also

 Loughborough Junction – the area around the station

References

External links

 Subterranea Britannica article – includes photographs and map of this station and Camberwell New Road station
 LJ4D project – a virtual 3d model which documents the evolution of the station and surrounding area over time

Railway stations in the London Borough of Lambeth
Former London, Chatham and Dover Railway stations
Railway stations in Great Britain opened in 1864
Railway stations served by Govia Thameslink Railway
Brixton
Railway stations served by Southeastern